The Union for Central African Renewal (URCA) is a political party in the Central African Republic led by Anicet-Georges Dologuélé.

History
The URCA was established on 25 October 2013. Dologuélé was chosen as the party's candidate for the 2015–16 presidential elections; although he finished as the leading candidate in the first round, he was defeated by Faustin-Archange Touadéra in the run-off. In the parliamentary elections it emerged as the joint-largest party in the National Assembly, winning 13 of the 131 seats.

Electoral results

Presidential elections

Parliamentary elections

References

2013 establishments in the Central African Republic
Political parties established in 2013
Political parties in the Central African Republic
Social democratic parties in Africa